John Charles Sime (3 August 1871 – 16 June 1961) was an Australian rules footballer who played with Collingwood in the Victorian Football League (VFL).

Notes

External links 

Charlie Sime's profile at Collingwood Forever

1871 births
1961 deaths
Australian rules footballers from Victoria (Australia)
Collingwood Football Club players